During the 1989–90 English football season, Leicester City F.C. competed in the Football League Second Division.

Season summary
In the 1989–90 season, the Foxes had a very poor start to the season with only 1 win from the first 12 league games that saw Leicester bottom of the second tier of English football for the first time since February 1915. At the end of the year, the Foxes found form with 6 wins from 7 games guided Leicester to mid-table and stayed there for most of the season, settling for a 13th-place finish. In March 1990, there was another chapter in the club's boardroom history when chairman Terry Shipman's father Len died at the age of 87.

Final league table

Results
Leicester City's score comes first

Legend

Football League Second Division

FA Cup

League Cup

Full Members Cup

Squad

Left club during the season

References

Leicester City F.C. seasons
Leicester City